Hose Station No. 4 is located in the Village of East Davenport in Davenport, Iowa, United States.  It is a contributing property of the Davenport Village Historic District that has been listed on the National Register of Historic Places since 1980.   The fire station  was individually listed on the Davenport Register of Historic Properties in 1993. It is one of two old fire stations on the east side of the city that are still in existence.  The other one is Hose Station No. 3.  The building sits adjacent to Lindsay Park and now houses the International Fire Museum.

History
The first group of volunteer firefighters in Davenport were organized in 1856 and called the Independent Fire Engine and Hose Company.  The city's first firehouse, Hose Station No. 1,  was built on Perry Street in 1877 for the Fire King Engine 2nd Hose Company.   In the first decades of the 20th-century, the city built other small hose stations throughout the city such as Hose Station No. 4.

The Davenport Fire Antique & Restoration Society was formed by four members of the Davenport Fire Department in 1984.  They acquired Hose Station No. 4 and opened the museum in 1986.  The museum contains artifacts and photographs pertaining to firefighting throughout the world.  It includes a 1951 Mack pumper from Riverdale, Iowa.

Architecture
The station was designed in the Italianate style.  It features a rectangular plan, hipped roof covered in tile and a short tower in the back where the hoses dried.  The red brick exterior features quoined corners in brick.  A single pair of fire-house doors, behind which the firefighting equipment was stored, fronted Eleventh Street.  The pedestrian entrance was along the side of the building.  Two large rectangular windows are above the fire-house doors and a dormer is on the roof above the main façade.

References

External links
International Fire Museum

Historic district contributing properties in Iowa
Fire stations completed in 1931
Italianate architecture in Iowa
Buildings and structures in Davenport, Iowa
Museums in Davenport, Iowa
Fire stations on the National Register of Historic Places in Iowa
Defunct fire stations in Iowa
Davenport Register of Historic Properties
Firefighting museums in the United States
National Register of Historic Places in Scott County, Iowa